Csécse is a village and municipality in the comitat of Nógrád, Hungary.

Etymology
The name comes from a Slavic *Čeča (a personal name Čéč).  There are similar place names in Slavic countries like Slovak Čečejovce, Čáčov, Czech Čečov and others. The historic Slovak name is Čéčka.

References

See also

List of cities and towns in Hungary

Populated places in Nógrád County